Lomariocycas is a genus of ferns in the family Blechnaceae, subfamily Blechnoideae, according to the Pteridophyte Phylogeny Group classification of 2016 (PPG I). The genus is accepted in a 2016 classification of the family Blechnaceae, but other sources sink it into a very broadly defined Blechnum, equivalent to the whole of the PPG I subfamily.

Species
, using the PPG I classification system, the Checklist of Ferns and Lycophytes of the World accepted the following species:

Lomariocycas aurata (Fée) Gasper & A.R.Sm.
Lomariocycas columbiensis (Hieron.) Gasper & A.R.Sm.
Lomariocycas cycadifolia (Colla) Gasper & A.R.Sm.
Lomariocycas decrescens (Rakotondr.) Gasper & A.R.Sm.
Lomariocycas insularis (C.V.Morton & Lellinger) Gasper & A.R.Sm.
Lomariocycas longepetiolata (Tardieu) Gasper & A.R.Sm.
Lomariocycas longipinna (Rakotondr.) Gasper & A.R.Sm.
Lomariocycas madagascariensis (Tardieu) Gasper & A.R.Sm.
Lomariocycas magellanica (Desv.) Gasper & A.R.Sm.
Lomariocycas moritziana (Klotzsch) Gabriel y Galán & Vicent
Lomariocycas obtusifolia (Ettingsh.) Gasper & A.R.Sm.
Lomariocycas palmiformis (Thouars) Gasper & A.R.Sm.
Lomariocycas rufa (Spreng.) Gasper & A.R.Sm.
Lomariocycas shaferi (Broadh.) Gasper & A.R.Sm.
Lomariocycas schomburgkii (Klotzsch) Gasper & A.R.Sm.
Lomariocycas tabularis (Thunb.) Gasper & A.R.Sm.
Lomariocycas werckleana (Christ) Gasper & A.R.Sm.
Lomariocycas yungensis (J.P.Ramos) Gasper & A.R.Sm.

References

Blechnaceae
Fern genera